Sean McGrath (born December 3, 1987) is an American football tight ends coach at Missouri Southern State University and a former tight end. He played college football at Eastern Illinois University and Henderson State, and signed with the Seattle Seahawks as an undrafted free agent in 2012. McGrath has also played for Kansas City Chiefs and San Diego / Los Angeles Chargers.

College career
McGrath began his college football career at Eastern Illinois University, where he red-shirted in 2006, and played sparingly in 2007, accumulating no statistics as a tight end and special teams player.  However, in 2008 he started at tight end and caught 28 passes for 301 yards and three touchdowns.  After being dismissed from the team for a violation of teams rules, he transferred to Henderson State where he played tight end. In 2011, his first season with the Reddies, he caught 55 passes for 656 yards and four touchdowns.  However, he went undrafted following the 2012 season in which an injury limited him to just four catches for 49 yards in four games.

Professional career

Seattle Seahawks
In April 2012, he signed with the Seattle Seahawks as an undrafted free agent. On August 31, 2012, he was released. On September 1, 2012, he was signed to the practice squad. On September 27, he was released from the practice squad.  On October 2, 2012, he was re-signed to the practice squad. On December 18, 2012, he was promoted to the active roster after the team released tight end Evan Moore.

Kansas City Chiefs
The Chiefs claimed McGrath off waivers on September 1, 2013. With nagging injuries to Anthony Fasano and Travis Kelce, McGrath was pushed into a starting role. He responded well, catching six passes for sixty-two yards in his first three games. Then went on to face the New York Giants in Week 4 at home leaving with five catches for sixty-four yards and a touchdown on September 29, 2013.

McGrath failed to report to training camp for the 2014 season, and was then subsequently place on the reserve/did not report list. On July 26, 2014, Chiefs head coach Andy Reid announced that McGrath planned to retire.

Indianapolis Colts
McGrath came out of retirement and signed with the Indianapolis Colts in June 2015. On September 5, 2015, he was waived by the Colts. After signing to the practice squad in October 2015, he was released on October 26.

San Diego / Los Angeles Chargers
On November 10, 2015, McGrath was signed by the Chargers. On November 21, 2015, he was waived. On November 24, 2015, he was signed to the practice squad. On December 28, 2015, McGrath was promoted to the 53-man roster.

Detroit Lions
On June 14, 2018, McGrath signed with the Detroit Lions. He was released on September 1, 2018.

Coaching career
He was hired as the tight ends coach at Missouri Southern State University in 2021.

References

External links
 Seattle Seahawks bio

1987 births
Living people
People from Mundelein, Illinois
Players of American football from Illinois
American football tight ends
Henderson State Reddies football players
Seattle Seahawks players
Kansas City Chiefs players
Indianapolis Colts players
San Diego Chargers players
Los Angeles Chargers players
Detroit Lions players